AlliedBarton was a Conshohocken, Pennsylvania-based security firm. The company was founded in 1957 as Allied Security, and in 2016 was merged with Santa Ana, California-based security and janitorial services company Universal Services of America to form Allied Universal.

History
AlliedBarton was founded as Allied Security in 1957 in Pittsburgh, Pennsylvania as a provider of contracted security guards and related services. 

In 2000, King of Prussia, Pennsylvania-based Spectaguard acquired Allied Security and took on the Allied Security name. The new company was reportedly the fourth largest security company in the United States, as well as the largest privately-held security company in the US.

In 2004, Allied Security acquired Malden, Massachusetts-based Security Systems Inc. (SSI) and Atlanta, Georgia-based Barton Protective Services to form AlliedBarton Security Services - creating the largest American-owned contract security services company in the United States. In 2004 and again in 2008, Allied Barton bid but failed to acquire M & M Investigations & Enforcement Bureau of Toledo, Ohio.

In 2006, AlliedBarton acquired San Antonio, Texas-based manned guarding firm Initial Security for $73.6 million.

In 2008, New York City-based investment group The Blackstone Group acquired AlliedBarton, for an undisclosed amount. 

In July 2015, Paris, France-based private investment firm Wendel acquired AlliedBarton from The Blackstone Group for US$1.67 billion. 

In 2016, AlliedBarton and Universal Services of America merged to form Allied Universal. In February 2017, the company officially began operations under its new name. After the merger, Allied Universal was considered the largest security company in North America.

Services

AlliedBarton provided uniformed security services.

References

External links
 Official website

Security companies of the United States
American companies established in 1957
Business services companies established in 1957
Technology companies established in 1957
Companies based in Conshohocken, Pennsylvania
1957 establishments in Pennsylvania